Perak Tengah District  (Central Perak) is a district in Perak, Malaysia. It is administered by the Perak Tengah District Council, which is based at the town of Seri Iskandar; Parit is however the largest settlement in the area.

Administrative divisions

Perak Tengah District is divided into 12 mukims, which are:
 Bandar
 Belanja
 Bota
 Jaya Baru
 Kampung Gajah
 Kota Setia
 Lambor Kanan
 Lambor Kiri
 Layang-Layang
 Pasir Panjang Hulu
 Pasir Salak
 Pulau Tiga

Demographics 

The following is based on Department of Statistics Malaysia 2010 census.

Federal Parliament and State Assembly Seats 

List of Perak Tengah district representatives in the Federal Parliament (Dewan Rakyat)

List of Perak Tengah district representatives in the State Legislative Assembly of Perak

Transportation

Car
Highways 109 and 5 are the main roads in the district, as well as 72 which goes to Parit and 73 to Batu Gajah.

Public transportation
Rail services are not available in the district; the nearest station is in Batu Gajah.

See also

 Districts of Malaysia

References

External links
Rancangan Tempatan Daerah Perak Tengah 2030